Laetiporus persicinus, commonly known as the white chicken mushroom, is an edible mushroom of the genus Laetiporus. It is closely related to the chicken mushroom, or Laetiporus sulphureus. Laetiporus persicinus has a salmon pink cap and white pores. This mushroom grows on dead and living hardwood and softwood trees.  It was first described scientifically by Miles Berkeley and Moses Ashley Curtis in 1853 as Polyporus persicinus. It has been collected in Africa, Australia, Asia, North America, and South America.

References

Edible fungi
Fungi described in 1853
Fungi of Africa
Fungi of Australia
Fungi of South America
Fungi of North America
persicinus
Taxa named by Miles Joseph Berkeley
Taxa named by Moses Ashley Curtis